Richard Janicek is a former speedway rider from Czechoslovakia.

Speedway career 
Janicek was champion of Czechoslovakia after winning the Czechoslovakian Championship in 1958.

References 

Czech speedway riders
Living people
Year of birth missing (living people)